Trumpeter is a neighbourhood in northwest Edmonton, Alberta, Canada that was established in 2008 through the adoption of the Big Lake Neighbourhood One Neighbourhood Structure Plan (NSP).

It is located within the Big Lake area and was originally considered Neighbourhood 1 within the Big Lake Area Structure Plan (ASP). It was officially named Trumpeter on August 19, 2009.
   
Trumpeter is bounded on the west and north by 215 Street or Winterburn Road and to the east of 199 Street; and a ravine to the south. Big Lake is located a short distance to the northwest of the neighbourhood.

Demographics 
In the City of Edmonton's 2014 municipal census, Trumpeter had a population of  living in  dwellings.

Surrounding neighbourhoods

References 

Neighbourhoods in Edmonton